Swinscowia is a genus of lichen-forming fungi in the family Strigulaceae. It has 34 species. Swinscowia was proposed in 2020 by lichenologists Shu-Hua Jiang, Robert Lücking, and Emmanuël Sérusiaux to contain non-foliicolous species that were isolated from bark and rocks. Swinscowia jamesii, a species that was originally described in genus Geisleria, and later transferred to Strigula, is the type species of the genus. The genus name honours British lichenologist Dougal Swinscow, who originally described the type species in 1967.

Species
 Swinscowia affinis 
 Swinscowia albicascens 
 Swinscowia albolinita 
 Swinscowia alpestris 
 Swinscowia amphora 
 Swinscowia aquatica 
 Swinscowia australiensis 
 Swinscowia bahamensis 
 Swinscowia bispora 
 Swinscowia calcarea 
 Swinscowia cavicola 
 Swinscowia confusa 
 Swinscowia decipiens 
 Swinscowia divisa 
 Swinscowia endolithea 
 Swinscowia fracticonidia 
 Swinscowia glabra 
 Swinscowia griseonitens 
 Swinscowia jamesii 
 Swinscowia johnsonii 
 Swinscowia laceribracae 
 Swinscowia muriconidiata 
 Swinscowia muriformis 
 Swinscowia muscicola 
 Swinscowia obtecta 
 Swinscowia pallida 
 Swinscowia porinoides 
 Swinscowia rhodinula 
 Swinscowia rostrata 
 Swinscowia rupestris 
 Swinscowia stigmatella 
 Swinscowia submuriformis 
 Swinscowia tagananae 
 Swinscowia thelopsidoides

References

Dothideomycetes
Lichen genera
Taxa described in 2020
Taxa named by Robert Lücking
Taxa named by Emmanuël Sérusiaux